FC Karpaty-2 Lviv was one of the three teams of the FC Karpaty Lviv. It was considered their junior squad with most of the players under 20 years of age. In 2010-2012 the team participated in the championship of the Lviv Oblast.

History
Karpaty-2 were originally formed in the Ukrainian Second League back in 1997. However in 2001 FC Lviv that competed in the Ukrainian First League was merged with Karpaty and FC Lviv was replaced with Karpaty-2, while the original team in the Second League was renamed to Karpaty-3.

At the end of 2003–04 season Karpaty Lviv were relegated which automatically caused its other two teams to move down the championship leagues. Coincidentally, the Premier League introduced the competition for reserves parallel to its league for 2004–05 season. Since returning to the Premiers for 2006–07 Karpaty introduced its own Reserve team based on the withdrawn Karpaty-3 in that championship.

In 2010 Karpaty withdrew one of its squads (Karpaty-2) from the professional ranks and placed it in the regional competition where it played until 2012.

League and cup history

{|class="wikitable"
|-bgcolor="#efefef"
! Season
! Div.
! Pos.
! Pl.
! W
! D
! L
! GS
! GA
! P
!Domestic Cup
!colspan=2|Europe
!Notes
|-
|align=center|1992-01
|align=center colspan=13| refer to FC Lviv
|-
|align=center|2001–02
|align=center|2nd
|align=center|12
|align=center|34
|align=center|12
|align=center|6
|align=center|16
|align=center|41
|align=center|52
|align=center|42
|align=center|
|align=center|
|align=center|
|align=center|
|-
|align=center|2002–03
|align=center|2nd
|align=center|5
|align=center|34
|align=center|10
|align=center|11
|align=center|13
|align=center|34
|align=center|38
|align=center|41
|align=center|
|align=center|
|align=center|
|align=center|
|-
|align=center|2003–04
|align=center|2nd
|align=center|16
|align=center|34
|align=center|8
|align=center|9
|align=center|17
|align=center|37
|align=center|48
|align=center|33
|align=center|
|align=center|
|align=center|
|align=center bgcolor=red|Relegated
|-
|align=center|2004–05
|align=center|3rd "A"
|align=center bgcolor=tan|3
|align=center|28
|align=center|15
|align=center|5
|align=center|8
|align=center|47
|align=center|30
|align=center|50
|align=center|
|align=center|
|align=center|
|align=center|
|-
|align=center|2005–06
|align=center|3rd "A"
|align=center|5
|align=center|28
|align=center|14
|align=center|4
|align=center|10
|align=center|39
|align=center|36
|align=center|46
|align=center|
|align=center|
|align=center|
|align=center|
|-
|align=center|2006–07
|align=center|3rd "A"
|align=center|8
|align=center|28
|align=center|10
|align=center|9
|align=center|9
|align=center|41
|align=center|35
|align=center|39
|align=center|
|align=center|
|align=center|
|align=center|
|-
|align=center|2007–08
|align=center|3rd "A"
|align=center|15
|align=center|30
|align=center|7
|align=center|3
|align=center|20
|align=center|33
|align=center|53
|align=center|24
|align=center|
|align=center|
|align=center|
|align=center|
|-
|align=center|2008–09
|align=center|3rd "A"
|align=center|14
|align=center|32
|align=center|9
|align=center|7
|align=center|16
|align=center|28
|align=center|43
|align=center|34
|align=center|
|align=center|
|align=center|
|align=center|
|-
|align=center|2009–10
|align=center|3rd "A"
|align=center|10
|align=center|20
|align=center|5
|align=center|1
|align=center|14
|align=center|17
|align=center|43
|align=center|16
|align=center|
|align=center|
|align=center|
|align=center|
|-
|align=center|2010–
|align=center colspan=13| competes in the Lviv Oblast
|}

Notes and references

See also
FC Karpaty Lviv
FC Karpaty-3 Lviv
FC SKA-Orbita Lviv

 
FC Karpaty Lviv
Football clubs in Lviv
Ukrainian reserve football teams
Defunct football clubs in Ukraine
Association football clubs established in 1997
Association football clubs disestablished in 2012
1997 establishments in Ukraine
2012 disestablishments in Ukraine